Rumpole and the Primrose Path is an anthology of light hearted legal comedy short stories by writer John Mortimer. It is the 12th in a series based in part on his own past experiences as a barrister but also notable for their use of themes topical at the time each was published. It begins with the aged barrister Horace Rumpole marooned in a nursing home where he feels some shady business is going on. Several of the stories in the collection were adapted as part of a series of 45 minute radio plays starring real life husband and wife duo Timothy West and Prunella Scales.
The short stories included in the work are:
Rumpole and the Primrose Path (part of radio series)
Rumpole and the New Year's Resolutions 
Rumpole and the Scales of Justice (part of radio series)
Rumpole and the Right to Privacy
Rumpole and the Vanishing Juror (part of radio series) 
Rumpole Redeemed (part of radio series)

Notes

BBC Radio comedy programmes
Comic short stories
Works by John Mortimer